Breeder may refer to:
Breeder, a person who practices the vocation of mating carefully selected specimens of the same breed
Breeder (animal), an individual animal used for selective breeding
Breeder reactor, a type of fast neutron reactor that produces more fissile material than it consumes
Breeder (slang), a pejorative term used against heterosexuals, especially those who have many children
Breeder (cellular automaton), a pattern in a cellular automaton which grows quadratically

Breeders may also refer to:
The Breeders, an American rock band
"Breeders", a song by Juliana Hatfield from the album Juliana's Pony: Total System Failure
Breeders' Cup, an annual series of thoroughbred horse races 
Breeders (film), an American science-fiction horror film
Breeders (TV series), an American-British comedy series created by and starring Martin Freeman

See also
Breed (disambiguation)